In enzymology, a lysine-pyruvate 6-transaminase is an enzyme that catalyzes the chemical reaction

L-lysine + pyruvate ⇌ L-2-aminoadipate 6-semialdehyde + L-alanine

Thus, the two substrates of this enzyme are L-lysine and pyruvate, whereas its two products are L-2-aminoadipate 6-semialdehyde and L-alanine.

This enzyme belongs to the family of transferases, specifically the transaminases, which transfer nitrogenous groups.  The systematic name of this enzyme class is L-lysine:pyruvate aminotransferase. Other names in common use include lysine-pyruvate aminotransferase, and Lys-AT.

References

 

EC 2.6.1
Enzymes of unknown structure